Palmyra Township is one of the eighteen townships of Portage County, Ohio, United States.  The 2000 census found 2,785 people in the township.

Geography
Located in the southeastern part of the county, it borders the following townships:
Paris Township - north
Newton Township, Trumbull County - northeast corner
Milton Township, Mahoning County - east
Berlin Township, Mahoning County - southeast corner
Deerfield Township - south
Atwater Township - southwest corner
Edinburg Township - west
Charlestown Township - northwest corner

No municipalities are located in Palmyra Township, although the unincorporated community of Diamond lies in the township's east.

Name and history
It is the only Palmyra Township statewide. A post office called Palmyra was established in 1807, and remained in operation until 1904. The community most likely was named after Palmyra, New York.  In the mid-1880s, Palmyra contained several factories, stores, and three saloons.

Government
The township is governed by a three-member board of trustees, who are elected in November of odd-numbered years to a four-year term beginning on the following January 1. Two are elected in the year after the presidential election and one is elected in the year before it. There is also an elected township fiscal officer, who serves a four-year term beginning on April 1 of the year after the election, which is held in November of the year before the presidential election. Vacancies in the fiscal officership or on the board of trustees are filled by the remaining trustees.

Education
Palmyra Township is served by the Southeast Local Schools, and Southeast High School is located in the township.

References

External links
County website

Townships in Portage County, Ohio
Townships in Ohio
Welsh-American culture in Ohio